Denys Louis de Rougemont (September 8, 1906 – December 6, 1985), known as Denis de Rougemont, was a Swiss writer and cultural theorist who wrote in French. One of the non-conformists of the 1930s, he addressed the perils of totalitarianism from a Christian point of view. After the Second World War, he promoted European federalism.

Life  
He studied at the University of Neuchâtel and in Vienna, and then moved to Paris in 1930. There he wrote for and edited various publications, associating with the personalist groupings and the non-conformists of the 1930s:  with Emmanuel Mounier and Arnaud Dandieu, he founded the magazines Esprit and L'Ordre Nouveau, and he also co-founded a magazine, with Roland de Pury, on existential theology, Hic et Nunc.

In June 1940, fearing that defeatism and the pressure of Nazi propaganda (and armies) would lead the federal government to submit to the Germans and give up the traditional democratic values of Switzerland, he led with Zurich University Professor Theophil Spoerri a group of young people which created a civil society organisation called the Gotthard League in order to defend both Christian values and the independence of Switzerland. De Rougemont wrote the movement's manifesto and on 22 July an "Appeal to the Swiss People" which was widely published in the Swiss press to rally support for the movement.

Later in 1940, after having authored a sharp column in a Swiss newspaper which infuriated the German government, he was sent to the United States and administered French broadcasting for the Voice of America.  He likewise taught at the École Libre des Hautes Études in New York before returning to Europe in 1946.

He founded in Geneva the "Centre Européen de la Culture" in 1950 and in 1963 the "Institut Universitaire d'Etudes Européennes" (IUEE, "Graduate Institute of European Studies", attached to the University of Geneva).  He was president of the Paris-based Congrès pour la Liberté de la Culture.  Probably his most influential work is Love in the Western World (1939, 1956, 1972; English translations 1940, 1956, 1982).

The 1989–1990 academic year at the College of Europe was named in his honour.

He is buried at the Cimetière de Plainpalais in Geneva.

Works

 Les Méfaits de l'Instruction publique (1929)
 Le Paysan du Danube (1932)
 Politique de la Personne (1934)
 Penser avec les Mains (1936)
 Journal d'un Intellectuel en chômage (1937)
 Journal d'Allemagne (1938)
 L'Amour et l'Occident (1939, revised 1956 and 1972), translated as Love in the Western World (US) and Passion and Society (UK)
 Nicolas de Flue (1939)
 Mission ou Démission de la Suisse (1940)
 Qu'est-ce que la Ligue du Gothard? (1940)
 La Part du Diable  (1942/1944) translated as The Devil's Share
 Les Personnes du Drame (1944)
 Journal des deux Mondes (1946)
 Doctrine Fabuleuse (1946)
 Vivre en Amérique (1947)
 L'Europe en jeu (1948)
 Lettres aux députés européens (1950)
 L'Aventure occidentale de l'Homme (1957)
 Comme Toi-Même (1961), translated as Myths of Love (1963)
 The Christian Opportunity (1963)
 Fédéralisme culturel (1965)
 La Suisse ou l'Histoire d'un Peuple heureux (1965)
 Journal d'une époque (1926-1946) (1968)
 Les Mythes de l'Amour (1972)
 L'Avenir est notre Affaire (1977)
 L'Ecrivain et la politique: les problèmes de l'engagement (1978)
 Vers la relance du débat européen? Le déclin de l'Europe, mythe et histoire (1978)
 De l'Europe des Etats coalisés à l'Europe des peuples fédérés (1978)
 Rapport au peuple européen sur l'état de l'union de l'Europe 1979 (1979)
 Formule d’une Europe parallèle ou rêverie d’un fédéraliste libertaire (1979)
 Inédits, ed by Jean Mantzouranis and François Saint-Ouen (1988)
 Dictionnaire international du fédéralisme (Dir.), ed by François Saint-Ouen (1994)

See also   
 Robert Aron  
 The Little Prince

References

Bibliography

 Bruno Ackermann, "A la recherche d'une éthique en littérature, l'oeuvre de Denis de Rougemont", La Licorne, Poitiers, 1989, t. 16, p. 421-437.
 Bruno Ackermann," Regards sur la Suisse dans l'oeuvre de Denis de Rougemont (1938-1940)", Equinoxe, Lausanne, 1989, t. 1, p. 29-58.
 Bruno Ackermann - François Saint-Ouen, "Rougemont, Denis de (1906-1985)", in 'Dictionnaire international du Fédéralisme (F. Saint-Ouen ed.), Bruxelles, Bruylant, 1994, p. 259-266.
 Bruno Ackermann, Denis de Rougemont, une biographie intellectuelle, Geneva, 1996.
 Bruno Ackermann, Denis de Rougemont - De la personne à l'Europe, Lausanne, 2000.
 Andrée Bachoud - Josefine Cuesta  - Michel Trebitsch (dir.),  Les intellectuels et l'Europe, de 1945 à nos jours, Paris, 2009.
 Christian Campiche, Denis de Rougemont, le séducteur de l'Occident, Geneva, 1999.
 Christian Campiche, Le nègre de la rose, essai, Charmey, 2004.
 Alain Chardonnens, Le jeune Denis de Rougemont contre l'école-prison, suivi de : La construction européenne selon Denis de Rougemont et Gonzague de Reynold, Geneva, 2001.
 Ariane Chebel d'Appollonia, Histoire politique des intellectuels en France (1944-1954), Paris, 1991.
 Collectif, Denis de Rougemont, aujourd'hui, Lausanne, 2007.
 Mary Jo Deering, Denis de Rougemont, l'Européen, Lausanne, 1991.
 Du personnalisme au fédéralisme européen, en hommage à Denis de Rougemont. Colloque, Geneva, 1989.
 Fabrizio Frigerio,  "L'engagement politique de Denis de Rougemont", Cadmos, Geneva, 1986, n.33, p. 115-124.
 Fabrizio Frigerio, "Rougemont, Denis de", in: Schweizer Lexikon, Mengis & Ziehr Ed., Luzern, 1991–1993, t. V, p. 428.
 Fabrizio Fabrizio [et alii], "Fédéralisme chez Rougemont", in: Dictionnaire international du Fédéralisme (F. Saint-Ouen ed.), Bruxelles, Bruylant, 1994, p. 202-204
 Fabrizio Frigerio, "Le rôle de l'école selon Denis de Rougemont", Les Cahiers du Val-de-Travers, 2006, n. 6, p. 12-14.
 Anne-Caroline Graber, Denis de Rougemont: une philosophie politique et une pensée européenne pour éclairer notre temps, Geneva, 2007.
 Jean Jacob, Le retour de "L'Ordre Nouveau" Les métamorphoses d'un fédéralisme européen, Geneva-Paris, 2000.
 Mario Kopić, "Ljubav ili smrt", Zarez, 2013, n. 365-366, p. 50.
 Silvio Locatelli, Denis de Rougemont. La vita e il pensiero, Milan, 1965.
 Jean-Louis Loubet del Bayle, Les non-conformistes des années 30, une tentative de renouvellement de la pensée politique française, Paris, 2001.
 Alexandre Marc, Une lumière qui ne s'éteint jamais, Nice, 1996.
 Joan Alfred Martìnez i Seguì, La filosofia social i polìtica de Denis de Rougemont. Personalisme i federalisme integral, València, 2009.
 Elisabeth du Réau, L'idée d'Europe au XXe siècle: des mythes aux réalités, Paris, 2001.
 André Reszler, Henri Schwamm,  Denis de Rougemont, l'écrivain, l'européen, Etudes et témoignages publiés pour le 70ème anniversaire de Denis de Rougemont, Neuchâtel, 1976.
 Sylvia Robert, Maryse Schmidt-Surdez, Michel Schlup, Denis de Rougemont: une vie pour l'Europe, exhibition 6.10.1995 - 2.3.1996, catalogue, Geneva, 1995.
 Undine Ruge, Die Erfindung des "Europa der Regionen". Kritische Ideengeschichte eines konservativen Konzepts, Francfort, 2003.
 François Saint-Ouen, Denis de Rougemont, introduction à sa vie et son oeuvre, Geneva, 1995.
 François Saint-Ouen, Les grandes figures de la construction européenne, Geneva, 1997.
 François Saint-Ouen, Denis de Rougemont et l'Europe des Régions, Geneva, 1998.
 François Saint-Ouen, Le fédéralisme, Gollion, 2005.
 François Saint-Ouen, "Denis de Rougemont, parcours d'une vie", in: Denis de Rougemont, l'Européen, exhibition organised by the Centre européen de la culture and the Fondation Martin Bodmer, Geneva, 2006, p. 23-29.
 François Saint-Ouen, "De la Culture et du dialogue des cultures chez Denis de Rougemont", in: Dialogue des Cultures à l’aube du XXIe siècle (sous la dir. de Dusan Sidjanski assisté de l’auteur), Bruxelles, 2007, p. 45-62.
 François Saint-Ouen, "Celui qui a commencé par la Culture", in: Penser l’Europe à Genève : l’héritage de Denis de Rougemont, (co-editeur avec Frédéric Esposito), Louvain-la-Neuve, 2008.
 François Saint-Ouen, L'Europe de Denis de Rougemont, Editions Academia, 2014.
 Christina Schulz,  "Neutralité et engagement : Denis de Rougemont et le concept de "neutralité active" ", A contrario, Vol. 4, No. 2, 2006.
 Pierre de Senarclens, Le mouvement "Esprit" 1932-1941, Lausanne, 1974.
 Dusan Sidjanski, "Denis de Rougemont, l'Européen", in: Denis de Rougemont, l'Européen, exhibition organised by the Centre européen de la culture and the Fondation Martin Bodmer, Geneva, 2006, p. 9-21.
 Nicolas Stenger, Denis de Rougemont. Les intellectuels et l'Europe au XXe siècle, Rennes, Presses universitaires de Rennes, 2015.
 Giangiacomo Vale, Pólemos. La dialettica federalista in Denis de Rougemont, in Ripensare il federalismo. Prospettive storico-filosofiche, a cura di S. Berardi e G. Vale, Nuova Cultura, Roma, 2013, p. 107-130
 Giangiacomo Vale, La croce, l’asse e la spira. Simbolismo dell’Occidente nell’opera di Denis de Rougemont, in «Metabasis», VIII, n° 16, 2013, pp. 55-71
 Giangiacomo Vale, La nazione e la guerra. Genealogia e prognosi del nazionalismo nel pensiero di Denis de Rougemont, in: Il senso di una guerra. Ragione, nazione, passione, irrazionalità alle origini della Grande Guerra, a cura di G. Vale, Nuova Cultura, Roma, 2016, pp. 143-172.
 Giangiacomo Vale, Una e Diversa. L'Europa di Denis de Rougemont, Milano-Udine, Mimesis, 2017.
 Bertrand Vayssière, Vers une Europe fédérale? les espoirs et les actions fédéralistes au sortir de la seconde guerre mondiale, Bruxelles, 2006.
 Verdaguer, Pierre, « Denis de Rougemont et la nouvelle censure », The French Review, Vol. LIX, No. 2, December 1985.
 Hélène Yèche, (dir.), Construction européenne: histoires et images des origines, Paris, 2009.

External links
 
 Videos: Denis de Rougemont, un dossier de la Télévision suisse romande.
 Etre un intellectuel, interview with Denis de Rougemont (1971) video on YouTube 
 Souvenirs of Denis de Rougemont on the Congrès de la Haye in 1948 (Geneva, May 1968).
 Article on Denis de Rougemont in the Dictionnaire Historique de la Suisse. 
 Denis de Rougemont, by Benedikt von Tscharner
 Fondation Denis de Rougemont
 Lycée Denis de Rougemont, at Neuchâtel.
 Alexandre Marc and Denis de Rougemont, by François Saint-Ouen.
 Conférence sur Denis de Rougemont, by Jean-Pierre Gouzy  (Paris, Maison de l'Europe, 2006).
 Article sur Denis de Rougemont, by Alain de Benoist. 
 Centenaire de la naissance de Denis de Rougemont, by Jean-Baptiste Mathieu.
 Rougemont 2.0 : The Complete Works of Denis de Rougemont online

1906 births
1985 deaths
European integration pioneers
People from Val-de-Travers District
Swiss writers in French
German–French translators
University of Neuchâtel alumni
Stateless nationalism in Europe
20th-century translators
Winners of the Prix Broquette-Gonin (literature)
Non-conformists of the 1930s